People's democracy is a theoretical concept within Marxism–Leninism and a form of government which developed after World War II and allows in theory for a multi-class and multi-party democracy on the pathway to socialism. People's democracy was established in a number of European and Asian countries as a result of the people's democratic revolutions of the 1940s.

Prior to the rise of fascism, communist parties had called for soviet republics to be implemented throughout the world, such as the Chinese Soviet Republic or William Z. Foster's book Toward Soviet America. However, after the rise of fascism, and the creation of the popular front governments in France and Spain, the Comintern under Bulgarian Communist leader Georgi Dimitrov began to advocate for a multi-party united front of the communist and social democratic parties as opposed to the one-party proletarian dictatorship of the Soviets.

The possibility of a multi-party people's democracy was first put forward during the popular front period against fascism.

History 
György Lukács was one of the first to suggest the possibility of communists working for a democratic republic in his Blum Thesis of 1929. Lukacs recounted in 1967: 
It is hard for most people to imagine how paradoxical this sounded then. Although the Sixth Congress of the Third International did mention this as a possibility, it was generally thought to be historically impossible to take such a retrograde step, as Hungary had already been a soviet republic in 1919.

Joseph Stalin, who had been in Soviet administration throughout the Russian Civil War and its aftermath, well remembered how the attempt to fight Bolshevik-style revolutions throughout Europe during and after World War I—the revolutions of 1917–1923—had mostly failed. Many Old Bolsheviks had thought at the time that these revolutions were the vanguard of the world revolution, but the latter never materialized. It was this very reality that had driven the development of the idea of socialism in one country as the Soviet Union's own path.

With such historical lessons in mind, Stalin suggested to the leaders of Eastern European communist parties at the end of World War II that they should present themselves as advocates of a people's democracy. After the defeat of Nazi Germany and its allies in Eastern Europe, Marxist–Leninist theoreticians first began expanding on the idea of a possible peaceful transition to socialism, given the presence of the Soviet Red Army. In most areas of Eastern Europe, the Communist Parties did not immediately take power directly but instead worked in Popular Coalitions with progressive parties. Unlike the Soviet Union, which was officially a one-party state, a majority of people's democracies of Eastern Europe were theoretically multi-party states. Many of the ruling Marxist–Leninist parties no longer called themselves Communist in their official title as they had in the 1930s. The Socialist Unity Party of Germany (SED) for instance was ostensibly a union of the SPD and the Communist Party of Germany. Many of the other European states were ruled by Worker's or Socialist Parties. In the Eastern Bloc, people's democracy was a synonym for socialist state.

The origins of the idea of people's democracy can be traced back to both the idea of popular front governments, which were coalitions of anti-fascist parties, such as the one that existed in Spain. The theory was perhaps first articulated by Bulgarian Communist Georgi Dimitrov.

Scholars have argued that the emergence of the theory acted as a way for the Soviet Union to legitimize its establishment of Socialist States, as well as the method by which they would be established. For one, the Soviet Union had to justify the creation of Soviet-aligned governments to the existing, non-Communist, political movements within Eastern European countries. The theory of people's democracy allowed the Soviet Union to assuage the concerns of such movements, as people's democracies were to be governed by a coalition of Anti-fascist parties. By creating a theory which contrasted the peaceful nature by which Socialism would be established in Eastern European countries with the violent nature it was established in the Soviet Union, the USSR was able to ease fears that many in anti-fascist parties had of a Bolshevik-style revolution.

Many Scholars and Historians have argued that the theory of people's democracy grew out of a need for the Communist Party of the Soviet Union to find a place within Marxist–Leninist theory for the different circumstances under which Socialism would emerge in Eastern Europe. For example, Ruth Amende Rosa stated:
the U.S.S.R. apparently felt obliged to establish its own position of ideological "leadership" in eastern Europe and, simultaneously, to fit the concept of "people's democracy" into the body of orthodox Marxist-Leninist doctrine.

— Ruth Amende Rosa, World Politics , Jul., 1949, Vol. 1, No. 4, The Soviet Theory of "People's Democracy"

The work of Marxian economist Eugen Varga was of particular importance to the development of the theory of people's democracy. His work entitled Changes in the Economy of Capitalism Resulting from the Second World War gave an explanation as to why newly emerging States were different from the Soviet model while still giving them their place as a transition stage facilitating the emergence of Socialism within the dominant Soviet theory of Marxism–Leninism. However, in 1949, Varga recanted his ideas, and many high ranking Communists, including Dimitrov, suggested that people's democracies actually were similar to the Soviet Union. This reflected the changed view within the Soviet Union that the character of the people's democracies was identical to that of the USSR itself.

The theory of people's democracy underwent a considerable change. In its initial conception, the theory stated that the newly emerging Soviet-aligned states were totally different in character than the Soviet Union, whereas its later conception held that they were quite similar to the Soviet model. The reason for this change is debatable. While Richard F. Staar argues that the initial instance of the theory was used to conceal the true intentions of establishing a one-party dictatorship in the model of the Soviet Union, other scholars have suggested that the uncertain nature of the time when the original theory was formulated help to account for why the theory underwent change once power was consolidated.

Mao Zedong proposed a similar idea of a cross-class democracy in the 1940 essay On New Democracy. In 1949, he would make a speech on the people's democratic dictatorship. The people's democratic model would later be applied to socialist states in Asia, including China, Laos, North Korea and Vietnam.

Ideology 

While people's democracies were considered a form of the dictatorship of the proletariat, classes such as the peasantry, petite bourgeoisie and progressive bourgeoisie were allowed to participate. Nikita Khrushchev explicitly stated that the possibility of peaceful transition to people's democracy was predicated on the global strength of the USSR as a superpower.

The Soviet Textbook A Dictionary of Scientific Communism defined people's democracy as follows: 

Trotskyists and other dissident anti-Stalinist Communists were against the idea of people's democracy which they saw as denying the Leninist insistence on the class essence of all state power.

The Marxists Internet Archive dictionary critiques people's democracy as follows:

See also 
 Democratic socialism
 Front organization
 People's republic
 Social democracy
Bloc party
 Dominant-party system
National Front (Czechoslovakia)
National Front (GDR)
Democratic Front of Albania
Front of National Unity
Patriotic People's Front
Patriotyczny Ruch Odrodzenia Narodowego
People's Democratic Front
Front of Socialist Unity and Democracy
Fatherland Front (Bulgaria)
United Front (China)
People's Front of Yugoslavia
Democratic Front for the Reunification of Korea
Vietnamese Fatherland Front
Lao Front for National Development

References

Bibliography

Further reading 
 

Political ideologies
Maoist terminology
Marxism–Leninism
Ideology of the Chinese Communist Party
Ideology of the Communist Party of the Soviet Union
Socialism
Soviet phraseology
Anti-capitalism
Stalinism
Types of democracy